Blue-tailed skink may refer to:

 Cryptoblepharus egeriae, a lizard native to Australia's Christmas Island
 Plestiodon elegans, the five-striped blue-tailed skink, a lizard found in East-Asia
 Plestiodon fasciatus, the five-lined skink of North America
 Trachylepis margaritifera, the rainbow mabuya  of Africa
 Trachylepis quinquetaeniata, the five-lined mabuya of Africa
 Panaspis megalurus, the blue-tailed snake-eyed skink of Tanzania
 Trachylepis quinquetaeniata, the blue-tailed skink of Africa (present in Florida as an invasive non-native species)

Animal common name disambiguation pages